Trachycosmus is a genus of spiders in the family Trachycosmidae. It was first described in 1893 by Simon. , it contains 4 Australian species.

Habitat: This specie is widely distributed, spider usually found wandering on open ground or in leaf litter.

Toxicity: Uncertain, may be aggressive when defending its egg sac.

References

Trochanteriidae
Araneomorphae genera
Spiders of Australia